The Hong Kong Sevens, referred to as the Cathay Pacific Credit Suisse Hong Kong Sevens for sponsorship reasons is the 5th stop on the IRB Sevens World Series. The 2009 event was played between the 27–29 March, and was won by Fiji. Unlike the 7 other tournaments, Hong Kong contains 24 teams to compete.

Teams

Pool Stages

Pool A
{| class="wikitable" style="text-align: center;"
|-
!width="200"|Team
!width="40"|Pld
!width="40"|W
!width="40"|D
!width="40"|L
!width="40"|PF
!width="40"|PA
!width="40"|+/-
!width="40"|Pts
|- 
|align=left| 
|3||3||0||0||108||19||+89||9
|-
|align=left| 
|3||2||0||1||53||36||+17||7
|-
|align=left| 
|3||1||0||2||47||63||-16||5
|-
|align=left| 
|3||0||0||3||15||105||-90||3
|}

Pool B
{| class="wikitable" style="text-align: center;"
|-
!width="200"|Team
!width="40"|Pld
!width="40"|W
!width="40"|D
!width="40"|L
!width="40"|PF
!width="40"|PA
!width="40"|+/-
!width="40"|Pts
|-
|align=left| 
|3||3||0||0||130||19||+111||9
|-
|align=left| 
|3||2||0||1||52||48||+4||7
|-
|align=left| 
|3||1||0||2||26||81||-55||5
|-
|align=left| 
|3||0||0||3||34||94||-60||3
|}

Pool C
{| class="wikitable" style="text-align: center;"
|-
!width="200"|Team
!width="40"|Pld
!width="40"|W
!width="40"|D
!width="40"|L
!width="40"|PF
!width="40"|PA
!width="40"|+/-
!width="40"|Pts
|-
|align=left| 
|3||3||0||0||128||5||+123||9
|-
|align=left| 
|3||2||0||1||94||34||+60||7
|-
|align=left| 
|3||1||0||2||38||99||-61||5
|-
|align=left| 
|3||0||0||3||26||148||-122||3
|}

Pool D
{| class="wikitable" style="text-align: center;"
|-
!width="200"|Team
!width="40"|Pld
!width="40"|W
!width="40"|D
!width="40"|L
!width="40"|PF
!width="40"|PA
!width="40"|+/-
!width="40"|Pts
|-
|align=left| 
|3||3||0||0||72||31||+41||9
|-
|align=left| 
|3||2||0||1||38||47||-9||7
|- 
|align=left| 
|3||1||0||2||46||41||+5||5
|-
|align=left| 
|3||0||0||3||26||63||-37||3
|}

Pool E
{| class="wikitable" style="text-align: center;"
|-
!width="200"|Team
!width="40"|Pld
!width="40"|W
!width="40"|D
!width="40"|L
!width="40"|PF
!width="40"|PA
!width="40"|+/-
!width="40"|Pts
|-
|align=left| 
|3||2||1||0||76||22||+54||8
|- 
|align=left| 
|3||2||1||0||71||29||+42||8
|-
|align=left| 
|3||1||0||2||49||47||+2||5
|-
|align=left| 
|3||0||0||3||7||105||-98||3
|}

Pool F
{| class="wikitable" style="text-align: center;"
|-
!width="200"|Team
!width="40"|Pld
!width="40"|W
!width="40"|D
!width="40"|L
!width="40"|PF
!width="40"|PA
!width="40"|+/-
!width="40"|Pts
|-
|align=left| 
|3||3||0||0||67||29||+38||9
|-
|align=left| 
|3||2||0||1||45||65||-20||7
|- 
|align=left| 
|3||1||0||2||46||45||+1||5
|-
|align=left| 
|3||0||0||3||34||53||-19||3
|}

Knockout

Bowl

Plate

Cup

Standings after Tournament

South Africa, who finished second in this tournament, went to the top of the IRB Sevens World Series. England, who were joint-first with South Africa before, dropped to second place, with Fiji going to third and New Zealand fourth.

Statistics

Individual points

Individual tries

References

External links
Hong Kong Sevens Profile on UR7s.com

2009
rugby union
2008–09 IRB Sevens World Series
2009 in Asian rugby union
March 2009 sports events in China